A. leucocephala may refer to:

 Amazona leucocephala, a medium-sized green parrot
 Amphisbaena leucocephala, Peters, 1878, a worm lizard species in the genus Amphisbaena
 Armeria leucocephala, a flowering plant species in the genus Armeria
 Arundinicola leucocephala, a small passerine bird in the tyrant flycatcher family

See also 

 Leucocephala (disambiguation)